Now most commonly refers 
to the present time.

Now, NOW, or The Now may also refer to:

Organizations
 Natal Organisation of Women, a South African women's organization
 National Organization for Women, an American feminist organization
 Now! (political party), a liberal political party in Poland
 National Oversight and Whistleblowers (NOW), a Malaysian NGO
 NYSE ticker symbol for ServiceNow, a cloud computing company

Media

 Now (Sky), an internet television service operated by British company Sky
 Now Business News Channel, a 24-hour finance news channel
 Now (British TV channel), a British television channel that started broadcasting in 1990 and ceased the same year
 Now TV (Hong Kong), a Hong Kong pay-TV service provider headquartered in Wan Chai North, Victoria City operated by PCCW Media Limited
 NOW.com, an online TV/broadband network, formerly Network of the World owned by PCCW
 NOW News, a Beirut-based Lebanese news website focused on the Middle East published in English and Arabic
 NOWTV, the previous on-air name of CHNU-DT in Surrey, British Columbia

Film, episode, or TV series
 No Opportunity Wasted, a Discovery Channel TV series hosted by Phil Keoghan
 "Now" (The Walking Dead), an episode of the television series The Walking Dead
 In Time, formerly titled Now, a 2011 American science fiction film
Now with Tom Brokaw and Katie Couric, referred to as Now, a 1993–94 news program
 Now on PBS, formerly NOW with Bill Moyers, a TV newsmagazine which aired from 2002 to 2010
 Now with Alex Wagner, an MSNBC news program premiering in 2011
 The Now, combination local news/national news program broadcast on E. W. Scripps Company television affiliates

Printed media
 Now (1940–1947), a political and literary periodical founded by George Woodcock
 NOW! (1979–81 magazine), a short-lived UK news magazine
 Now (newspaper) (1981–), also known as NOW Magazine, a Canadian alternative newsweekly 
 The Now (newspaper) (1984–2017), a Canadian biweekly
 NOW Comics, an American comics publisher, active 1985–2005
 Now (1996–2019 magazine), a former British weekly entertainment magazine
 TV Now (2000–), an Irish television magazine
 Now (manhwa) (2001–2007), a Korean graphic novel weekly, 2001-7
 Now (book), a 2017 book about radical leftist politics by anonymous author(s) The Invisible Committee

Music
 The Now, an English punk rock group
 The Now, a name used by American rock band Tripsichord Music Box
 NOW Nightmares on Wax, DJ and electronic music composer
 Now That's What I Call Music!, a series of various artist compilation albums released in the United Kingdom and Ireland

Albums
 Now (Anna Abreu album), 2008 album by Finnish singer Anna Abreu
 Now (Astrud Gilberto album), 1972 album by Astrud Gilberto
 Now (Bibi Zhou album), 2007 album by Chinese singer Bibi Zhou
 Now (Black Uhuru album), 1990 album by Jamaican reggae band Black Uhuru
 Now! (Bobby Hutcherson album), 1970 album by jazz vibraphonist Bobby Hutcherson
 Now (Cara Jones album), 2000 album by Cara Jones
 Now (Dionne Warwick album), 2012 album by Dionne Warwick
 Now (The Dubliners album), 1975 album by The Dubliners
 Now (Eric Kloss album), 1978 album by saxophonist Eric Kloss
 Now (Fireflight album), 2012 album released by Christian rock band Fireflight
 Now! (France Joli album), 1982 album by singer France Joli
 Now! (Other Dimensions In Music album), 1997 album by jazz quartet Other Dimensions In Music
 Now (Girugamesh album), 2010 album by Girugämesh
 Now (Jade Warrior album), 2008 album by British band Jade Warrior
 Now (Jessica Andrews album), 2003 album by country music singer Jessica Andrews
 Now (John Paul Young album), 1996 album by Australian pop singer John Paul Young
 Now (Nearly 36), 2003 album by King Creosote
 Now (Maxwell album), 2001 album by American R&B singer Maxwell
 Now (Mucky Pup album), 1990 album by hardcore band Mucky Pup
 Now (MYMP album), 2008 album by M.Y.M.P.
 Now (The New Seekers album), 1973 album by British pop group The New Seekers
 Now (Patrice Rushen album), 1984 album by American Patrice Rushen
 Now (Peter Frampton album), 2003 album by Peter Frampton
 Now (Paul Rodgers album), 1997 album by English rock musician Paul Rodger
 Now (Shania Twain album), 2017 album by Canadian Shania Twain
 Now! (Sonny Stitt album), 1963 album by jazz saxophonist Sonny Stitt
 Now (Ten Years After album), 2004 album by blues rock band Ten Years After
 Now (Vigleik Storaas album), 2007 album by Vigleik Storaas Trio
 Now (The Tubes album), 1977 album by The Tubes
 Now, an album by Bhagavan Das
 Now, 1972 album by George Baker
 Now, 2001 album by Greg Long
 Now, 1997 album by Kosmos Express
 Now, 1973 album by Lou Sino
 Now, 1955 album by Steve Roach
 Now (EP), 1992 EP by Band of Susans

Songs
 "Now" (Def Leppard song), from the album X
 "Now" (Joywave song), from the album How Do You Feel Now?
 "Now" (Paramore song), from the album Paramore
 "Now" (Staind song), from the album Staind
 "Now", by Avail from the album Front Porch Stories
 "Now", by Brotherhood of Man from the album Love and Kisses from Brotherhood of Man
 "Now", by Carpenters from the album Voice of the Heart
 "Now", by Days of the New from the album Days of the New
 "Now", by Edie Brickell from the album Shooting Rubberbands at the Stars
 "Now", a single by Eyedea & Abilities
 "Now", a song by Gotthard from the album Domino Effect
 "Now", by Krokus from the album Change of Address
 "Now", by Logic from the deluxe album version Under Pressure (album)
 "Now", by Nomeansno from the album 0 + 2 = 1
 "Now", by Prince from the album The Gold Experience
 "Now", by Trouble Maker from the album Chemistry
 "Now!", by Sandra from the album The Wheel of Time
 "Now!", by Scorpions from the album Blackout

Other uses
 Google Now, a mobile personalized search application by Google
 Negotiable order of withdrawal account, a type of bank account
 Network of Workstations, a computer network
 Northern Ohio and Western Railway, an Ohio railroad

See also

 
 The Now Show, a British radio comedy show
 Now, Now, a U.S. rock band
 Now and Forever (disambiguation)